The Ice Palace is a novel by the Norwegian author Tarjei Vesaas, first published in 1963. The original novel is written in nynorsk and considered a classic of Norwegian literature. It has been translated to English by Peter Owen Publishers, London, and was scheduled for reissue with them in Christmas of 2017 in their Cased Classics series. Vesaas received The Nordic Council's Literature Prize for the novel in 1964.

Plot
The vivacious 11-year-old Siss lives in a rural community in Norway. Her life is changed when a quiet girl, Unn, moves to the village to live with her aunt after the death of her unmarried mother. Siss and Unn can't wait to meet. They finally do, at Unn's house. They talk for a while, Unn shows Siss a picture from the family album of her father, then Unn persuades Siss that they should undress, just for fun. They do, watching each other, and Unn asks whether Siss can see if she is different. Siss says no, she can't, and Unn says she has a secret and is afraid she will not go to heaven. Soon they dress again, and the situation is rather awkward. Siss leaves Unn and runs home, overwhelmed by fear of the dark.

Unn does not want to feel embarrassed when meeting Siss the next day, so she decides to skip school and instead goes to see the ice castle that has been created by a nearby waterfall. Ice castles are normal in cold winters, when the water freezes into huge structures around waterfalls. Unn climbs into this ice castle, exploring the rooms baffled by its beauty. In the 7th room she gets disoriented and cannot find her way out. She dies of hypothermia. Her last word is "Siss".

When the search for Unn remains fruitless, people wonder if Siss knows more about the disappearance than she lets on. They wonder what had passed between them the night before. Siss for her part is overwhelmed by loss and loneliness, and she makes a promise that she will never forget Unn. Therefore, Siss takes upon herself the role Unn had: standing alone in the school yard refusing to play or speak. Thus, she has to find her way out of her own emotional ice castle, before she can continue on the road towards adolescence and adulthood.

Film version

The film starred 12-year-olds Line Storesund as Siss and Hilde Nyeggen Martinsen as Unn. It was directed by Per Blom in 1987, who was awarded the Grand Prix at the Flanders International Film Festival in 1988. The film focuses slightly more on Unn's secret feelings than the novel, but otherwise it's very true to the book, with the same slow snow-laden pace. The film had its first release on VHS (PAL) in 1991. This is no longer available and an official DVD release has yet to emerge. But the film has circulated as bootleg DVDs and downloads.

Editions

Norwegian (nynorsk)
 Is-slottet. - Oslo : Gyldendal, 1982. - 140 p. - (Lanterne ; 153). -  (paperback)
 Is-slottet. - Oslo : Gyldendal, 1985. - 140 p. - (De nye klassikerne). -  (paperback)
 Is-slottet. - Oslo : Ariel lydbokforl., 1992. - (Ariel's lydbøker) -  (audio book)
 Is-slottet. - Oslo : Gyldendal, 1995. - 140 p. - (Gyldendal pocket). -  (paperback)
 Is-slottet : roman. - Oslo : Gyldendal, 1997. - 140 p. -  (paperback)
 Kimen ; Fuglane ; Is-slottet. - Oslo : Gyldendal, 1988. - 509 p. (Norske klassikere). -  (hardcover)
 Is-slottet. - Oslo : De norske bokklubbene, 2002. - 124 p. - (Århundrets bibliotek) -  (hardcover)
 Vesaas' beste. -  Oslo : Gyldendal, 2006. - 617 p. - (Forfatternes beste). - Contains the three novels Kimen, Fuglane and Is-slottet as well as selected short stories and poems. -  (hardcover)

English
 The Ice Palace / translated by Elizabeth Rokkan. - First edition of first English translation. - London: Peter Owen Publishers, 1966. - 176 pp. (hardcover)
 The Ice Palace / translated by Elizabeth Rokkan. - New ed. - London: Peter Owen Publishers, 1993. - 176 pp. -  (hardcover)
 The Ice Palace / translated by Elizabeth Rokkan. - New ed. - London: Peter Owen Publishers, 2002. - 176 pp. -  (paperback)
 The Ice Palace / translated by Elizabeth Rokkan. - New ed. - London: Peter Owen Publishers, 2009. - 176 pp. -  (paperback)

Spanish
 El Palacio de Hielo / translated by Kirsti Baggethun Kristensen and Asunción Lorenzo Torres. - New ed. - Ediciones Bruguera, 2007. - 208 pp. -  (paperback)

References

1963 Norwegian novels
20th-century Norwegian novels
Novels set in Norway
Norwegian novels adapted into films
Novels by Tarjei Vesaas
Nordic Council's Literature Prize-winning works